Mach 1 Racing was a NASCAR Winston Cup Series team. It was owned by Hollywood stuntman Hal Needham and actor Burt Reynolds.

The team made its debut in 1981, fielding the No. 22 Skoal Pontiac driven by Stan Barrett. Barrett ran ten races for the team that season, his best finish coming at Talladega Superspeedway, where he finished 9th. Midseason, Mach 1 created a second car, the No. 33, driven by Harry Gant. Gant did not win that season, but he won three poles and had thirteen top-tens, finishing third in points.

In 1982, Gant drove the No. 33 Buick full-time with sponsorship from 7-Eleven/Skoal. He won at Martinsville and Charlotte and finished fourth in points. After just one win the following season, the team switched to Chevrolet, and Gant won three races, finishing a career best second in points. He followed that season up with another three wins in 1985.

For the next three years, Gant and Mach 1 failed to visit victory lane. Midway into the 1988 season, Gant suffered injuries at the Coca-Cola 600. Morgan Shepherd filled in for him, and had one top-five and two top-tens. After Gant finished 27th in the final standings, he left the team for Jackson Bros. Motorsports, taking Skoal and No. 33 with him.

In 1989, Needham sold the team to Bill Edwards, a North Carolina businessman, switched to the No. 66 and signed rookie driver Rick Mast. In their first race together, the Daytona 500, Mast drove the unsponsored car to a sixth-place finish, an accomplishment he later said was the one he was the most proud of. Mast and Mach 1 ran twelve more races together that season, they were unable to duplicate that effort. Edwards closed the team and sold it to their crew chief, Travis Carter.  Travis Carter Motorsports entered NASCAR competition in the 1990 Daytona 500.

External links 
Hal Needham Winston Cup Owner Statistics

1981 establishments in the United States
1989 disestablishments in the United States
Defunct NASCAR teams
American auto racing teams